The participation of Portugal in the Junior Eurovision Song Contest first began at the Junior Eurovision Song Contest in  which took place in Bucharest, Romania. Rádio e Televisão de Portugal (RTP), a member of the European Broadcasting Union (EBU), were responsible for the selection process of their participation. Portugal used a national selection format, broadcasting a show entitled "Festival da Canção Junior", for their participation at the contests. This was a junior version of Festival da Canção, the national music competition organised by broadcaster RTP to choose the Portuguese entry for the Eurovision Song Contest. The first representative to participate for the nation at the 2006 contest was Pedro Madeira with the song "Deixa-me sentir", which finished in second-last place out of fifteen participating entries, achieving a score of twenty-two points. Their worst result to date has been achieved by Rita Laranjeira with her song "Gosto de tudo (já não gosto de nada)" in the Junior Eurovision Song Contest 2018 where she placed 18th. They withdrew again in  due to the COVID-19 pandemic. In 2022 the country surpassed this record and reached 8th place.

History
Portugal provisionally confirmed their participation in the  contest, but did not appear on the final list of participants. Portugal returned in 2021 with Simão Oliveira, who came 11th, giving Portugal their best result up to that point. This achievement was then surpassed in 2022, when Portugal came 8th with Nicolas Alves and the song ‘Anos 70’, which was also the first entry sung entirely in Brazilian Portuguese dialect.

Participation overview

Commentators and spokespersons
The contests are broadcast online worldwide through the official Junior Eurovision Song Contest website junioreurovision.tv and YouTube. In 2015, the online broadcasts featured commentary in English by junioreurovision.tv editor Luke Fisher and 2011 Bulgarian Junior Eurovision Song Contest entrant Ivan Ivanov. The Portuguese broadcaster, RTP, sent their own commentators to the contest in order to provide commentary in the Portuguese language. Spokespersons were also chosen by the national broadcaster in order to announce the awarding points from Portugal. The table below list the details of each commentator and spokesperson since 2005.

See also
 Portugal in the Eurovision Dance Contest – Dance version of the Eurovision Song Contest.
 Portugal in the Eurovision Song Contest – Senior version of the Junior Eurovision Song Contest.
 Portugal in the Eurovision Young Dancers – A competition organised by the EBU for younger dancers aged between 16 and 21.
 Portugal in the Eurovision Young Musicians – A competition organised by the EBU for musicians aged 18 years and younger.

Notes

References

Countries in the Junior Eurovision Song Contest
Portuguese music